Charlie Kolar (born February 10, 1999) is an American football tight end for the Baltimore Ravens of the National Football League (NFL). He played college football at Iowa State.

Early years
Kolar grew up in Norman, Oklahoma and attended Norman North High School, where he played football and basketball. As a junior he caught 52 passes for 920 yards and 13 touchdowns. Kolar was named first-team All-State as a senior after recording 66 receptions for 1,240 yards and 12 touchdowns. He was a basketball teammate of NBA All-Star Trae Young at Norman North. Kolar committed to play college football at Iowa State going into his senior year over offers from Air Force, Army and Stephen F. Austin. Kolar signed with Iowa State despite a late recruiting push from Oklahoma State.

College career
Kolar redshirted his true freshman season. As a redshirt freshman, he played in all 13 of Iowa State's games and finished the season with 11 receptions for 137 yards and three touchdowns and was named second-team All-Big 12 Conference by the league's coaches. Kolar caught 51 passes for 697 yards and seven touchdowns as a redshirt sophomore and was named first-team All-Big 12. Following the end of the season he considered entering the 2020 NFL Draft, but opted to return for his redshirt junior season. Kolar was named first-team All-Big 12 for a second straight season after finishing his redshirt junior year with 44 receptions for 591 yards and a team-high seven touchdown receptions. In 2021, Kolar was awarded with the William V. Campbell Trophy, known as the "academic Heisman".

Professional career

Kolar was selected by the Baltimore Ravens in the fourth round, 128th overall, of the 2022 NFL Draft. He was placed on injured reserve on August 31, 2022. He was activated on November 8.

Personal life
Kolar's older brother, John, played quarterback at Oklahoma State and graduate transferred to Iowa State for the 2019 season. His younger brother, Ben, plays football and basketball in Norman, Oklahoma, while his other younger brother, Sam, attends the University of Arkansas. His younger sister Katie is committed to play volleyball at West Virginia University.

References

External links
 Baltimore Ravens bio
Iowa State Cyclones bio

1999 births
Living people
American football tight ends
Iowa State Cyclones football players
Players of American football from Oklahoma
Sportspeople from Norman, Oklahoma
Baltimore Ravens players